Casciago is a comune (municipality) in the Province of Varese in the Italian region Lombardy, located about  northwest of Milan and about  west of Varese.

Casciago borders the following municipalities: Barasso, Gavirate, Luvinate, Varese.

Casciago could very well be the location of the ancient Cassiciacum, where Saint Augustine and a few friends lived together in a kind of philosophical commune after Augustine's conversion to Christianity.

Demographic evolution

References

Cities and towns in Lombardy